The Hirth F-40 is a German aircraft engine, that was designed and produced by Hirth of Benningen for use in ultralight aircraft.

By March 2018, the engine was no longer advertised on the company website and seems to be out of production.

Design and development
The Hirth F-40 is a four-cylinder, two-stroke,  displacement, liquid-cooled, gasoline engine design, with a helical gear mechanical gearbox reduction drive. It produces  at 4800 rpm.

Specifications (F-40)

See also

References

Hirth aircraft engines
Two-stroke aircraft piston engines
Air-cooled aircraft piston engines
2000s aircraft piston engines